Worth the Weight is the sixth studio album by Canadian heavy metal band Anvil. It is Anvil's only release on Mausoleum Records and their only release with Sebastian Marino on guitar, replacing Dave Allison.

Track listing

Personnel
Anvil
Steve "Lips" Kudlow – vocals, lead guitar
Sebastian Marino – lead guitar
Ian Dickson – bass
Robb Reiner – drums

Production
Paul Lachapelle – producer, engineer, mixing
Abdul Hasad Mohammed – executive producer

References

Anvil (band) albums
1992 albums
Mausoleum Records albums